The United Football League Division 2, often referred to as UFL Division 2 or UFL 2, was the second-tier association football league in the Philippines. During its existence, it is the second-highest division of football in the Philippines after UFL Division 1. Each year, the winner of the league gets an automatic promotion to the latter. The second placer, on the other hand, goes against the ninth placer of the first division in a two-legged playoff.

UFL Division 2 was introduced for the 2010 season. For the 2015 season, Ceres and Manila Jeepney were promoted to compete in the country's top-flight division. Due to its inability to comply with the league's foreigner cap rule, Manila Nomads volunteered to step down from UFL Division 1 before the start of the 2014 season. Thus, Manila Jeepney was also automatically promoted to the first division.

The league was scrapped after the 2015 season with the 2016 season to push through with only a single division.

History

Inception of second-tier league
After the end of 2011 season, seven new clubs  entered the United Football League as part of the formation of UFL Division 2. Among the clubs that participated in the inaugural run of the second division, which commenced on 14 January 2012, include Agila, Cebu Queen City United, Diliman, Forza, Laos, Pachanga, and Team Socceroo participated in the second division. Manila Nomads won the first-ever UFL Division 2 title, and the club was promoted to UFL Division 1 the following season. Two other clubs from the second division were also promoted to the first division, namely: Pasargad and Stallion.

Pachanga was crowned UFL Division 2 champion for the 2012 season. The club finished at the top of the second division, which secured the team's promotion to UFL Division 1. Freddy Gonzalez, the a striker for Pachanga, was awarded the golden boot of UFL Division 2 for the 2012 season. Thus, Pachanga replaced the relegated Navy in the first division.

Expansion year and restructuring
At the start of the 2012 season, UFL Division 2 got expanded to 12 football clubs. Most of the matches for the second division were held at the Turf@BGC, a venue with an artificial football pitch located at Fort Bonifacio, Taguig City. The league kicked off its first match between Dolphins United and Cebu Queen City United on February 9, 2013, at the Emperador Stadium. However, Cebu Queen City United did not show up in the game time.

On 1 March 2013, the UFL management has officially ruled out Cebu Queen City United from participating after the club apparently withdrawn  when the club’s request for home games in Cebu was turned down by the league.

A new promotion-relegation system was adopted by the league at the start of the 2013 season. The club that finishes second in UFL Division 2 also has a chance of being promoted via a two-legged aggregate-goal playoff against the ninth-place team in the first division, similar to the system used in the Bundesliga.

Introduction of foreigner cap rule
For the 2014 season, relegated Philippine Air Force was replaced by Team Socceroo, the champions of the 2013 UFL Division 2. Further, Manila Nomads voluntarily stepped down from the first division to play in UFL Division 2 due to the club's inability to comply with UFL Division 1's foreigner cap rule before this season commenced. The UFL executive committee decided to implement a version of the foreign player rule. Under such rule, a club may only field in a maximum of five foreign players on the pitch at any given time. However, two of the six remaining players on the pitch may still be foreigners provided that they are permanent residents of the Philippines for at least five years. In addition, Ceres also made their league debut during this season.

Summary
The top club in UFL Division 2 each season receive an automatic promotion to the first division. Starting the 2013 season, the second placer also gets a chance of being promoted via a two-legged playoff against the ninth-place club in UFL Division 1.

* Bold designates promoted clubs† Lost the promotion and relegation playoff‡ Won the promotion and relegation playoff and got promoted

Clubs

Honors

Golden boot winners

Golden ball award

Golden glove trophy

See also
 UFL Division 1
 PFF National Men's Club Championship
 Filipino Premier League

References

External links
 
United Football League Philippines at Facebook.com
United Football League Philippines at Twitter.com
RSSSF.com - Philippines - List of Champions

2
2
Summer association football leagues
Sports leagues established in 2009
2009 establishments in the Philippines
2015 disestablishments in the Philippines
Phil